Aemene altaica is a moth of the family Erebidae. It was described by Julius Lederer in 1855. It is found in the Russian Far East (northern and western Altai, Middle Amur, Primorye, southern Sakhalin), China (Xinjiang, Heilongjiang), Korea and Japan.

References

Cisthenina
Moths described in 1855
Moths of Asia